Christopher Newport University (CNU) is a public university in Newport News, Virginia. It was founded in 1960 and is named after Christopher Newport, captain of one of the ships which carried settlers of Jamestown, the first permanent English settlement in North America.

History
In 1960, the city of Newport News joined with the Commonwealth of Virginia to create Christopher Newport College (CNC), which opened its doors in 1961 and at the time was located in the old John W. Daniel School building. The college was founded as an extension of the College of William & Mary and offered extension courses that had already been available in the area for some time. In 1964, the college was moved to its current location, a  tract of land purchased and donated by the city. That same year, the college's first permanent building was dedicated as Christopher Newport Hall. In 1971, CNC became a four-year college; however, it remained an extension of William & Mary until 1977 when it attained its independence. In 1992, the college became a university under the leadership of President Anthony R. Santoro, who oversaw the building of the first residence hall.
In 1996, CNU made plans to become more competitive. Those plans included the expansion of university property, several new buildings, and residence halls, as well as overhauling academic programs and the admission process.

Presidents
H. Wescott Cunningham 1961–1970
James C. Windsor 1970–1979
John E. Anderson 1979–1987
Anthony Santoro 1987–1996
Paul S. Trible Jr. 1996–2022
Adelia Thompson 2022–present (Interim)

Academics

Admissions
In 2022, U.S. News & World Report found that Christopher Newport University admissions were "selective" with an acceptance rate of 89%. For over a decade, the university has not required submission of SAT, ACT or CLT scores, but for the many students who still chose to submit scores, the middle 50% of applicants admitted had an SAT score between 1110 and 1320 or an ACT score between 25 and 29. There are minimum GPA and rank-in-class requirements for test-optional consideration, but the university uses a holistic review process in admissions that takes many other factors into consideration.

Rankings
For 2022-2023, U.S. News & World Report ranked Christopher Newport University #5 overall, #45 for Best Value, tied #11 for Most Innovative, tied #126 in Top Performers on Social Mobility, and #2 in Top Public Schools out of 136 Regional Universities in the South.

Degrees and programs
Christopher Newport University offers a variety of four-year Bachelor of Science and Bachelor of Arts degrees. Graduate programs in applied physics and computer science, environmental science and teaching are also available in five-year bachelor's to master's, as well as traditional formats. Academic programs are offered through the College of Arts and Humanities, the College of Natural and Behavioral Sciences, and the College of Social Sciences, including the Joseph W. Luter III School of Business.

Joseph W. Luter III School of Business

The School of Business is accredited by the AACSB. The Luter School offers degrees in management, marketing, accounting, and finance, and includes a Masters in Financial Analysis program. Alan Witt, Class of 1976 graduate and former CEO of PBMares, was named dean of the Luter School of Business on August 17, 2021.

College of Arts and Humanities
CNU's College of Arts and Humanities includes the Departments of English, Fine Art and Art History, History, Modern and Classical Languages and Literatures, Music, Philosophy and Religion, and Theater and Dance.

The Department of Fine Art and Art History
The Fine Art Department, located in the Mary M. Torggler Fine Art Center, offers a degree in fine arts with concentrations in art history and studio art.

The Department of Theatre & Dance
The Theatre & Dance Department offers a degree in theater arts and a Bachelor of Music degree.

Army Reserve Officer Training Corps (ROTC)
The Army Reserve Officer Training Corps has maintained a strong presence at CNU for several years, offering classroom and field based training. The program is a component of the College of William and Mary's ROTC program, known as the Revolutionary Guard Battalion. It commissions several new US Army second lieutenants each year.

Athletics

CNU participates mainly in the NCAA Division III Coast to Coast Athletic Conference (C2C, which was known as the Capital Athletic Conference before November 2020), having moved from the USA South Athletic Conference in July 2013. The football team remains a USA South associate member because C2C does not sponsor football. CNU fields a wide variety of college level teams on the Division III level. The Freeman Center houses the basketball, volleyball, and indoor track teams, while the lacrosse, soccer, baseball, softball, and field hockey teams play at a complex called "Captain's Field." The football and outdoor track teams compete at TowneBank Stadium. Ratcliffe Hall was expanded in 2012 and now includes various athletic offices as well as the varsity gym. A sailing center is also located close to the campus along the James River.

The men's basketball program captured the first national championship in a men's sport when it won the 2023 NCAA Division III national championship on March 18, 2023.

CNU sports club programs include ice hockey, equestrian, dressage, cycling, fishing, lacrosse, martial arts, rock climbing, rugby, scuba diving, silver storm dance, soccer, swimming, table tennis, tennis, ultimate frisbee, rowing and volleyball.

Sports

 Baseball
 Cross country (men's and women's)
 Basketball (men's and women's)
 Cheerleading
 Field hockey
 American football
 Golf 
 Lacrosse (men's and women's)
 Sailing
 Soccer (men's and women's)
 Softball
 Swimming
 Tennis (men's and women's)
 Track
 Volleyball

Campus

Residence halls
Residence halls on campus are usually segregated into the class of student living in them. In the recent years, new policies have been enacted that require all freshman and sophomore students to live in an on campus housing facility, unless they live in the commuting zone. Starting with the class of 2014, all students must live on campus during the junior year in addition to their freshman and sophomore years.

The David Student Union

The David Student Union (DSU) is a $36 million,  facility whose construction began in 2003 and opened September 9, 2006. Constructed in a "Neo-Georgian" architectural style, the first floor contains the campus Convenience Store, parallel the DSU dining facilities: The Discovery Bistro, Discovery Cafe, Chick-fil-A, Discovery Pizza, and Regatta's. The campus Bookstore and Convenience Store closed during the Fall 2010 semester in favor of an online bookstore and instead contains a student lounge, admissions office, and apparel store. All on-campus students receive a mailbox and access to a full-service Post Office located on the second floor of the DSU. Four large conference rooms named for past U.S. Presidents are located around a central lobby area at the top of the steps. The Ballroom is also located on the second floor. The building provides offices for Student Life, The Captain's Log, Auxiliary Services, Study Abroad, and others. Private desks with computers are provided for students as well as quiet study sections and recreational areas. The building was named in honor of William R. and Goldie R. David.

Academic buildings
For the opening of the Spring 2010 semester, Christopher Newport University opened the Lewis Archer McMurran Jr. Hall. This building has neo-Georgian architecture. The building is 85,000 square feet and frames the university's Great Lawn on its western side. McMurran Hall houses the Departments of Modern and Classical Languages and Literatures, History, English, and Government. It has a 150-person lecture hall, two 50-person lecture halls, and over 25 other classrooms.

To the north of McMurran Hall is Ratcliffe Hall, the former home of the Departments of English and Government. Once CNU's gymnasium, the building was renovated to include classroom and office space for students and faculty. Other academic buildings on campus include Gosnold Hall, Forbes Hall, and the Business and Technology Center (BTC Building), located across Prince Drew Lane. The Ferguson Center for the Arts is home to the Departments of Music and Theater & Dance. The most recent addition to the academic buildings is the Mary M. Torggler Fine Arts Center, which became home to the Department of Fine Art and Art History upon its opening in 2021.

Wingfield Hall, the former home of the Departments of Psychology and Language, was demolished in 2011 to make way for the Joseph W. Luter Hall, home of the school of business.

The Joseph W. Luter III Hall is the house of the Luter School of Business. The building, following the Neo-Georgian architecture of surrounding new structures, has a new 100-seat tiered lecture hall, 14 traditional classrooms, teachings labs, research labs and faculty offices.

The Mary Brock Forbes Integrated Science Building is a  academic hall situated on the north edge of the great lawn, and houses the College of Natural and Behavioral Science as well as the Biology, Chemistry, Environmental Science and Psychology departments. It also includes spaces for students to interact, 50 faculty offices, a large lecture hall, 50 classrooms, and research labs.

The Paul and Rosemary Trible Library
The university's library, renamed for Rosemary and Paul S. Trible Jr., had a multimillion-dollar addition completed in early 2008. The new 
 facility houses most of its collection in the original section. The new library was dedicated January 24, 2008, and fully opened at the start of the Spring 2008 semester. The Trible Library boasts a new Einstein's Cafe, a 24-hour study lounge, and an IT help desk.

In early 2009, the Mariners' Museum Library relocated to the Trible Library, providing students and the community with convenient access to the largest maritime history collection in the Western Hemisphere. The Paul and Rosemary Trible Library expanded beginning in 2016 to add another floor to the back portion of the facility. Due to the renovations, the Mariners' Museum Library moved back to the Mariners' Museum and reopened in Fall 2017.

In August 2018, the library expansion opened adding 3 floors of new space. Additions included a 100-seat theater, expanded Media Center, a two-story reading room, and 44 group study rooms.

Ferguson Center for the Arts
In 1996 the university acquired the Ferguson High School building and property, which was adjacent to campus. This building was used for classrooms until it was extensively renovated to become the Ferguson Center for the Arts, which opened in fall of 2005. Many features of the original high school, which was located between what is now the concert hall and the music and theatre hall, can still be seen throughout the current building. It houses a 1,725-seat concert hall which is acoustically engineered so that anyone on stage can be heard from any seat without a microphone, A 453-seat music and theatre hall, and a 200-seat studio theatre. It also contains two art galleries, a dance studio, and several classrooms.

Mary M. Torggler Fine Arts Center 
First open in fall 2021, the Mary M. Torggler Fine Arts Center serves not only as Christopher Newport University's Department of Fine Art and Art History academic building, but also as a fine arts center for the surrounding area of Hampton Roads, Virginia.  According to their website, the Torggler Center, "...seeks to enrich the cultural landscape of the commonwealth of Virginia by presenting exceptional visual arts programming that empowers creative expression, critical thinking, lifelong learning and cultural dialogue,". The Torggler Center hosts rotating exhibitions, community classes, university classes, and alumni centered galleries.

Pope Chapel
Opened in early 2013, the Pope Chapel, named for Larry Pope of Smithfield Foods, is a  gathering place for various on campus religious organizations located at the campus entrance across from York River Hall and the Trible Library.

Christopher Newport Hall
In the fall of 2015 a new administration building was opened and named Christopher Newport Hall. The  structure houses the Office of Admission, Office of the Registrar, Financial Aid, Housing, the Center for Academic Success, the President's Leadership Program and the Center for Career Planning, among others. The $42 million facility serves as a new landmark on campus and is at the head of the Great Lawn opposite Lewis Archer McMurran Jr. Hall. In May 2015, towards the end of construction, Newport Hall served as the backdrop for commencement ceremonies.

Student life

The Captain's Log
The Captain's Log is a student-run organization that acts as the official newspaper of Christopher Newport University.

Currents 
Currents is CNU's completely student-run literary magazine. Students from all disciplines may submit poetry, fiction, creative non-fiction, playwriting, and lyrics. Currents is also CNU's oldest on-campus organization.

Greek life

Greek life at Christopher Newport has grown in the recent years to include eight North American Interfraternity Conference listed fraternities, seven National Panhellenic Conference listed sororities and five NPHC listed Greek organizations.

NIC fraternities
 Kappa Delta Rho 
 Kappa Sigma
 Phi Gamma Delta
 Pi Kappa Alpha
 Pi Lambda Phi
 Sigma Phi Epsilon
 Delta Upsilon 
 Psi Upsilon

NPC sororities
 Alpha Phi
 Alpha Sigma Alpha
 Gamma Phi Beta
 Phi Mu
 Zeta Tau Alpha
 Alpha Delta Pi
 Delta Gamma

NPHC-listed
 Alpha Phi Alpha fraternity
 Alpha Kappa Alpha sorority
 Kappa Alpha Psi fraternity
 Delta Sigma Theta sorority
 Zeta Phi Beta sorority

Other fraternities
 Alpha Chi (National Honor Society)
 Alpha Kappa Psi co-ed professional business fraternity
 Alpha Phi Omega co-ed service fraternity
 Alpha Psi Omega co-ed honorary theater fraternity
 Beta Gamma Sigma (Business Honor Society)
 Beta Beta Beta (Biological Honor Society)
 Eta Sigma Phi (Classics Honor Society)
 Gamma Sigma Epsilon (Chemistry Honor Society)
 Kappa Pi (Honorary Art Fraternity) Zeta Alpha Tau Chapter
 Lambda Pi Eta (Communication Honor Society), Sigma Kappa Chapter
 Nu Kappa Epsilon (Music Service Sorority), Beta Chapter
 Omicron Delta Kappa (ODK, Honor and Leadership Society)
 Phi Alpha (Social Work Honor Society), Chi Kappa Chapter
 Phi Alpha Delta (PAD, Professional Pre-Law Fraternity)
 Phi Alpha Theta (History Honor Society), Alpha Zeta Mu Chapter
 Phi Mu Alpha Sinfonia men's social music fraternity
 Phi Sigma Tau (Philosophy Honor Society)
 Pi Sigma Alpha (Political Science Honor Society)
 Pi Kappa Lambda co-ed honorary fraternity in music
 Pi Mu Epsilon (Mathematics Society)
 Psi Chi (Psychology Honor Society)
 Sigma Alpha Iota women's music sorority
 Kappa Kappa Psi Co-Ed Honorary music fraternity
 Sigma Alpha Omega (Christian Sorority)
 Sigma Tau Delta (English Honor Society), Iota Omicron Chapter
 Theta Alpha Kappa (National Honor Society in Religion and/or Theology)
 Upsilon Pi Epsilon (Honor Society for the Computing and Information Disciplines)

Campus ministries
The campus has several religious organizations. These include Reformed University Fellowship (RUF), InterVarsity Christian Fellowship (IV), Young Life, Campus Crusade for Christ (CRU), Catholic Campus Ministry, Fellowship of Christian Athletes, Lutheran Student Fellowship. These organizations are now able to meet and hold events in the Pope Chapel, which opened in early 2013.

WCNU Radio
WCNU Radio is a student-run, non-commercial, web-based radio station.

Notable people

Alumni
William Lamont Strothers (BA, '91); NBA player, Portland Trail Blazers, Dallas Mavericks
Robin Abbott (BA, '98); Former Virginia House of Delegates Representative for the 93rd District.
Michael Caro; (BA '08); soccer player
Shirley Cooper; (BA '64); Former Virginia House of Delegates Representative for the 96th District.
Cassidy Hutchinson; (BA'19); Former White House aide and assistant to former U.S. President Donald Trump's White House Chief of Staff Mark Meadows.
Gary Hudson; actor - Did not graduate
Karen Jackson; (BA '87), Former Virginia Secretary of Technology
Randall Munroe; (BS '06) creator of xkcd.
Chris Richardson; American Idol finalist - Did not graduate
Sam Ruby; (BA '82); Software Engineer.
Colleen Doran; Cartoonist
C9 Meteos (William Hartman); professional League of Legends player - Did not graduate
Michael P. Mullin; (BA '04) Virginia House of Delegates Representative for the 93rd District.
Jesse Pippy; (BA '04) Maryland House of Delegates Representative for the 4th District.
Melanie Rapp; (BA '90) Virginia House of Delegates Representative for the 96th District.
Kaitlyn Vincie; (BA '10) sports presenter and journalist.
Jeion Ward; (BA '95) Virginia House of Delegates Representative for the 92nd District.
Mojo Rawley; (AS ‘05) former NFL Player for the Green Bay Packers and Arizona Cardinals, former WWE superstar.
Noah Green; (BA, '19) Perpetrator of the April 2021 United States Capitol car attack.

Faculty
 Jeffrey Bergner, former Assistant Secretary of State for Legislative Affairs
 Philip Dimitrov, former Prime Minister of Bulgaria
 Seth Roland (born 1957), soccer player and coach

Sources

References

External links

 Official website

 
Education in Newport News, Virginia
Educational institutions established in 1960
Universities and colleges accredited by the Southern Association of Colleges and Schools
Tourist attractions in Newport News, Virginia
1960 establishments in Virginia
Public universities and colleges in Virginia